Cleistanthus apodus, commonly known as the weeping Cleistanthus, is a tree in the family Phyllanthaceae native to Papua New Guinea and northeast Queensland. It was first described in 1873 by the English botanist George Bentham in his seven-volume book Flora Australiensis.

References

External links
 
 
 View a map of historical sightings of this species at the Australasian Virtual Herbarium
 View observations of this species on iNaturalist
 View images of this species on Flickriver

apodus
Endemic flora of Queensland
Taxa named by George Bentham
Plants described in 1873